Calisto pulchella is a butterfly of the family Nymphalidae. Described by Percy Ireland Lathy in 1899, it is endemic to Hispaniola.

The larvae are a pest on sugarcane, but the native host plant is unknown.

Subspecies
Calisto pulchella pulchella (lowland)
Calisto pulchella darlingtoni Clench, 1943 (Cordillera Central)

References

Butterflies described in 1899
Calisto (butterfly)
Butterflies of the Caribbean